The Ancien Pont is a bridge in Cotonou, Benin.  The bridge crosses the Lagune de Cotonou which separates the two sides of the city.  It was built in 1928 and renovated in 1981.

References

Bridges in Benin
Buildings and structures in Cotonou
Bridges completed in 1928